is an anime Original Video Animation. The original Japanese version was released in 1989 by Anime International Company, and an English Language version in 1996, licensed by Central Park Media.  It is about John Stalker who is a research pilot for the fictional Central Guard Company. John was born in the city of Cyber-wood, in an area known as the Cancer Slums. The antagonist of the story, Adler, plans to attack the citizens of the Cancer Slums.

In this Japanese animated science fiction adventure, cities of the future are plagued by violence, and the Central Guard Company is commissioned to find a solution to urban crime. One designer creates a Guard Suit with special psychic powers, while another develops a robotic killing machine that will not only eliminate the bad guys, but also get rid of his romantic rivals in the process. But when John Stalker is given the assignment of testing the Guard Suit, it uncovers a dark and dangerous secret he has kept hidden from the world.

References

Further reading
 Jonathan Clements, Helen McCarthy, The anime encyclopedia, Stone Bridge Press, 2006
 Trish Ledoux, Doug Ranney, Fred Patten, The complete anime guide, Tiger Mountain Press, 1997
 Andy Mangels, Animation on DVD: The Ultimate Guide, Stone Bridge Press, 2003
 James M. Craddock, Video Source Book, Thompson Gale, 2006
 Video Watchdog, Issues 31–36, Tim & Donna Lucas, 1996
 The Video Librarian, Volumes 10–11, Randy Pitman, 1995

External links 
 

1989 anime OVAs
Anime International Company
Central Park Media
Cyberpunk anime and manga